David Bartlett (born 1968) is an Australian politician.

David Bartlett may also refer to:

Sir David Bartlett, 3rd Baronet (1912–1989), British fencer
David Bartlett (bishop) (1900–1977), Bishop of St Asaph
David L. Bartlett (1941–2017), minister of the American Baptist Churches
David Bartlett (Arizona politician), state legislator
David Bartlett (North Dakota politician) (1855–1913), American lawyer and politician in North Dakota